Leonid Vladimirovich Nikolayev (August 13, 1878October 11, 1942) was a Russian Empire/Soviet pianist, composer and pedagogue.

Biography 
Nikolayev was born in Kiev in 1878. He studied at the Moscow Conservatory with Sergei Taneyev and Mikhail Ippolitov-Ivanov. For many years Nikolayev was a professor of piano at the Leningrad Conservatoire, and was for a short and unsuccessful period director of the institution. His students at the Conservatory included Vladimir Sofronitsky, Maria Yudina, Dmitri Shostakovich, Vera Razumovskaya, Nathan Perelman, Wiktor Labunski, Vera Vinogradova, Samary Savshinsky, Nadia Reisenberg, Alexander Zakin.

He became close friends with Shostakovich—Shostakovich "admired him as a first-class musician and a man of great wisdom and learning" and also said of him: "He trained not simply pianists, but in the first place thinking musicians. He didn't create a school in the specific sense of some single narrow professional direction. He shaped and nurtured a broad aesthetic trend in the sphere of pianistic art." Shostakovich's 1943 Piano Sonata No. 2 was dedicated to his former teacher.

Nikolayev was evacuated to Tashkent along with other musicians, after Germany invaded Russia in 1941, and died there in 1942.

His compositional output includes symphonic works, choral works, string quartets, and solo works for violin, cello, and piano.

Notes

References 
 Shostakovich, Dmitri and Glikman, Isaak (2001). Story of a Friendship: The Letters of Dmitry Shostakovich to Isaak Glikman. Cornell University Press. .
 Baker’s Biographical Dictionary of 20th Century Classical Musicians

External links 
 

1878 births
1942 deaths
Classical pianists from the Russian Empire
Music educators from the Russian Empire
Composers from the Russian Empire
Soviet pianists
Academic staff of Saint Petersburg Conservatory
Piano pedagogues